Four Peaks is a prominent landmark on the eastern skyline of Phoenix. In winter, Four Peaks offers much of the Phoenix metro area a view of snow-covered peaks. Four Peaks is the site of an amethyst mine that produces top-grade amethyst.

The name Four Peaks is a reference to the four distinct peaks of a north–south ridge forming the massif's summit. It is the highest point in Maricopa County.

Four Peaks Wilderness
The Four Peaks Wilderness, established in 1984, covers 60,740 acres of land. It is home to a diverse variety of plants and animals due to the quick change of elevation in the range. Brown's Trail, found in the Four Peaks Wilderness, is used to reach the tallest peak and is home to black bears, ring-tailed cats, skunks, and coyotes. The Four Peaks Wilderness contains a section of the Arizona Trail, which is considered one of the most difficult passages, as it is infrequently maintained. On April 27, 1996, a party of two campers left a campfire unattended near Lone Pine Saddle. This caused the Lone Fire which burned over 61,000 acres and lasted 11 days. The Lone fire was Arizona's largest recorded wildfire prior to the Rodeo–Chediski Fire in 2002.

References

External links

 
 
 "Four Peaks Wilderness". Tonto National Forest.

Landforms of Gila County, Arizona
Landforms of Maricopa County, Arizona
Mountains of Arizona
Mountains of Gila County, Arizona